The Herzliya Cinematheque is located on a passage between Sokolov Street and HaRishonim Street in Herzliya. Subsequent to the renovation of two out of three of former "Star" cinema complex's original halls in 2008, the Cinematheque was reopened, and since then films and movies are screened in the two halls, which can seat up to 275 people.

The Cinematheque screens premiere and pre-premiere industrial films, as well as Israeli documentaries and feature films, foreign movies, new and old movies, and others.

The third hall was opened in 2009, and can seat up to 60 people. It is mainly used for the screenings of films that require an intimate environment. It is also where the pub "Theodore" is located. Themed evenings, shows, and lectures are carried out in this hall, as well as the screening of some movies.

The Herzliya Cinematheque hosts Israeli and foreign filmmakers, and has regular screenings which are carried out and directed by film critics, actors, academics, and creators, as well as the hosting of short festivals which center different cultures, for example Indian Cinema (a collaboration between the Cinematheque and the Indian Embassy in Israel) and Japanese Cinema (a collaboration between the Cinematheque and the Israel-Japan Friendship Association).

The Cinematheque is accessible to handicapped and disabled persons. The complex has an elevator for wheelchairs, special seating, special hearing devices for the hearing impaired and other special services.

External links
Herzliya Cinematheque Official Website
Article in Maariv: "A New Cinematheque in Herzliya" (Hebrew)

Cinemas and movie theatres in Israel
Film archives in Israel
2008 establishments in Israel